Greatest Hits is the first compilation album by American singer-songwriter Bruce Springsteen, released February 27, 1995, on Columbia Records. It is a collection of some of Springsteen's hit singles and popular album tracks through the years along with four new songs at the end, mostly recorded with the E Street Band in 1995. The latter constituted Springsteen's first (albeit very partial) release with his backing band since the late 1980s. Some of the songs are shorter versions of the original album releases.

The incorporation of the "new" tracks was portrayed in the 1996 documentary Blood Brothers. "Murder Incorporated" and "This Hard Land" were, in fact, unused 1982 songs from the Born in the U.S.A. sessions, with the latter being re-recorded here more than a decade later, and both subsequently became Springsteen concert staples. "Blood Brothers", on the other hand, was played only as the final closing song of both the 1999–2000 Reunion Tour and 2002–2003 Rising Tour, both times with an extra verse added. "Secret Garden" achieved notoriety via the soundtrack of the 1996 film Jerry Maguire. Alternate versions of several of these new tracks were released on the 1996 Blood Brothers EP.

The compilation was commercially successful, hitting the peaks of the U.S. album chart and UK Album Chart and selling six million copies in the U.S.

Critical reception 
The reception by music critics of Greatest Hits was rather negative upon the album's release, as are more contemporary reviews. David Browne of Entertainment Weekly felt that the album was released when it was because the Grammy Awards were coming up and "Streets of Philadelphia" was up for five awards and that the songs on the album were selected because of charting success, which means that several important songs were overlooked. He also felt that "Murder Incorporated" (in reference to the 1930s Murder, Inc.) was the only good new song on the album and that overall the album felt as if Bruce did not believe in himself any more.

The Rolling Stone review of the album by Parke Puterbaugh is rather unfavorable. Parke felt that the songs on the collection belonged on their original LP releases, that songs from before Born to Run should have been included and that the new songs weren't that good.

Commercial performance
The album debuted at number one on the Billboard 200 the week of March 18, 1995, with more than 250,000 copies sold, it remained on the chart for 43 weeks. As of March, 2009 it has sold over 4,092,000 copies in the United States according to Nielsen SoundScan. It was certified four times platinum by the RIAA on July 23, 1999, for shipments of 4,000,000.

In the United Kingdom the album entered at number one on March 11, 1995, and topped the chart for two non consecutive weeks. It was present on the chart for 134 weeks. It was certified four times platinum by the BPI on March 21, 2014, denoting shipments of 1,200,000 units.

Track listing

Personnel (tracks 15-18)
Credits are adapted from the liner notes of Greatest Hits.

Roy Bittan – piano, synthesizer
Clarence Clemons – saxophone (15–17), percussion
Danny Federici – organ, synthesizer, accordion
Bruce Springsteen – guitar, vocals (harmonica on "Thunder Road," "This Hard Land," and "Blood Brothers")
Garry Tallent – bass guitar
Max Weinberg – drums
Steven Van Zandt – guitar on "Murder Incorporated," mandolin on "This Hard Land"
Nils Lofgren – guitar (15, 17, 18)
Patti Scialfa – vocals on "Secret Garden"
backing vocals ("Murder Incorporated") – all of the above except Nils Lofgren and Patti Scialfa
Frank Pagano – percussion on "Blood Brothers" and "This Hard Land"
Produced by: Bruce Springsteen, Jon Landau & Chuck Plotkin (and by Steven Van Zandt on "Murder Incorporated")
Recorded by: Toby Scott
Mixed by: Bob Clearmountain
Mastered by: Bob Ludwig
Assistant Engineers: Carl Glanville, Pete Keppler, Ryan Freeland, Jay Militscher & Tony Duino-Black
Sequence Editing: Brian Lee
Recorded at The Hit Factory

Charts

Weekly charts

Year-end charts

Certifications and sales

See also 
 List of best-selling albums in Australia

References 

1995 greatest hits albums
Bruce Springsteen compilation albums
Albums produced by Steven Van Zandt
Albums produced by Jon Landau
Albums produced by Chuck Plotkin
Columbia Records compilation albums